Faruk Bihorac (born 12 May 1996) is a Serbian professional footballer who plays as a centre-back for Akademija Pandev. He has also played for Bosnian Premier League club Velež Mostar among other clubs.

References

External links

1996 births
Living people
Sportspeople from Novi Pazar
Bosniaks of Serbia
Serbian footballers
Serbian expatriate footballers
Serbian expatriate sportspeople in Bosnia and Herzegovina
Expatriate footballers in Bosnia and Herzegovina
Serbian SuperLiga players
Serbian First League players
Premier League of Bosnia and Herzegovina players
FK Novi Pazar players
FK Hajduk Kula players
FK Kabel players
FK Velež Mostar players
Association football midfielders